The 1783 English cricket season was the 12th in which matches have been awarded retrospective first-class cricket status. The scorecards of four first-class matches have survived.

Matches 
Four first-class match scorecards survive from 1783, including two matches between Kent XIs and Hampshire XIs. One of these matches, played in July at Windmill Down, is the first first-class match known to have finished as a tie.

Other events
A portrait of Edward "Lumpy" Stevens was probably executed this year. The picture is at Knole House, seat of the Duke of Dorset in Sevenoaks.

First mentions
 Stephen Amherst
 Couchman (Kent)
 James Wells

References

Further reading
 
 
 
 
 

1783 in English cricket
English cricket seasons in the 18th century